Dorymyrmex wheeleri is a species of ant in the genus Dorymyrmex. Described by Kusnezov in 1952, the species is endemic to the United States.

References

Dorymyrmex
Hymenoptera of North America
Insects described in 1952